Merchandising is any practice which contributes to the sale of products to a retail consumer. At a retail in-store level, merchandising refers to displaying products that are for sale in a creative way that entices customers to purchase more items or products.

In retail commerce, visual display merchandising means merchandise sales using product design, selection, packaging, pricing, and display that stimulates consumers to spend more. This includes disciplines and discounting, physical presentation of products and displays, and the decisions about which products should be presented to which customers at what time. Often in a retail setting, creatively tying in related products or accessories is a great way to entice consumers to purchase more.

Merchandising helps to understand the ordinary dating notation for the terms of payment of an invoice. Codified discounting solves pricing problems including markups and markdowns. It helps to find the net price of an item after single or multiple trade discounts and can calculate a single discount rate that is equivalent to a series of multiple discounts. Further, it helps to calculate the amount of cash discount for which a payment qualifies.

Promotional merchandising

The annual cycle of merchandising differs between countries and even within them, particularly relating to cultural customs like holidays, and seasonal issues like climate and local sporting and recreation. Events such as Chinese festivals and Japanese festivals are incorporated in an annual cycle of shop decorations and merchandise promotion.

In the United States, the basic retail cycle begins in early January with merchandise for Valentine's Day, which is not until mid-February. Presidents' Day sales are held shortly thereafter. Following this, Easter is the major holiday, while springtime clothing and garden-related merchandise is already arriving at stores, often as early as mid-winter (toward the beginning of this section, St. Patrick's Day merchandise, including green items and products pertaining to Irish culture, is also promoted). Mother's Day and Father's Day are next, with graduation gifts (typically small consumer electronics like digital cameras) often being marketed as "dads and grads" in June (though most college semesters end in May; the grads portion usually refers to high school graduation, which ends one to two weeks after Father's Day in many U.S. states). Summer merchandise is next, including patriotic-themed products with the American flag, out by Memorial Day in preparation for Independence Day (with Flag Day in between). By July, back-to-school is on the shelves and autumn merchandise is already arriving, and at some arts and crafts stores, Christmas decorations. 

(Often, a Christmas in July celebration is held around this time.) The back-to-school market is promoted heavily in August, when there are no holidays to promote. By September, particularly after Labor Day, summer merchandise is on final closeout and overstock of school supplies is marked-down some as well, and Halloween (and often even more of the Christmas) merchandise is appearing. As the Halloween decorations and costumes dwindle in October, Christmas is already being pushed on consumers, and by the day after Halloween retailers are going full-force with advertising, even though the "official" season doesn't start until the day after Thanksgiving. Christmas clearance sales begin even before Christmas at many retailers, though others begin on the day after Christmas and continue on at least until New Year's Day but sometimes as far out as February.

Merchandising also varies within retail chains, where stores in places like Buffalo might carry snow blowers, while stores in Florida and southern California might instead carry beach clothing and barbecue grills all year. Coastal-area stores might carry water skiing equipment, while ones near mountain ranges would likely have snow skiing and snowboarding gear if there are ski areas nearby.

Retail supply chain

In the supply chain, merchandising is the practice of making products in retail outlets available to consumers, primarily by stocking shelves and displays. While this used to be done exclusively by the stores' employees, many retailers have found substantial savings in requiring it to be done by the manufacturer, vendor, or wholesaler that provides the products to the retail store. In the United Kingdom, there are a number of organizations that supply merchandising services to support retail outlets with general stock replenishment and merchandising support in new stores. By doing this, retail stores have been able to substantially reduce the number of employees needed to run the store.

While stocking shelves and building displays is often done when the product is delivered, it is increasingly a separate activity from delivering the product. In grocery stores, for example, almost all products delivered directly to the store from a manufacturer or wholesaler will be stocked by the manufacturer's/wholesaler's employee who is a full-time merchandiser. Product categories where this is common are Beverage (all types, alcoholic and non-alcoholic), packaged baked goods (bread and pastries), magazines and books, and health and beauty products.    
For major food manufacturers in the beverage and baked goods industries, their merchandisers are often the single largest employee group within the company. For nationwide branded goods manufacturers such as The Coca-Cola Company and PepsiCo, their respective merchandiser work forces number in the thousands.

Licensing
In marketing, one of the definitions of merchandising is the practice in which the brand or image from one product or service is used to sell another. Trademarked brand names, logos, or character images are licensed to manufacturers of products such as toys or clothing, which then make items in or emblazoned with the image of the license, hoping they'll sell better than the same item with no such image.  For the owners of the IP (intellectual property) in question, merchandising is a very popular source of revenue, due to the low cost of letting a third party manufacture the merchandise, while the IP owners collect the merchandising (royalty) fees.

In 1903, a year after publishing The Tale of Peter Rabbit, English author Beatrix Potter created the first Peter Rabbit soft toy and registered him at the Patent Office in London, making Peter the oldest licensed fictional character. Erica Wagner of The Times states, "Beatrix Potter was the first to recognise that content—as we now call the stuff that makes up a book or a film—was only the beginning. In 1903, Peter hopped outside his pages to become a patented soft toy, which gave him the distinction of being not only Mr. McGregor‘s mortal enemy, but also becoming the first licensed character".

Children

Merchandising for children is most prominently seen in connection with films and videogames, usually those in current release and with television shows oriented towards children. 

Merchandising, especially in connection with child-oriented films, TV shows and literature, often consists of toys made in the likeness of the show or book’s characters (action figures) or items which they use. This was first seen with the Peter Rabbit soft toy in 1903, with the Smithsonian magazine stating Beatrix Potter "created a system that continues to benefit all licensed characters, from Mickey Mouse to Harry Potter." However, sometimes it can be the other way around, with the show written to include the toys, as advertising for the merchandise. 

Sometimes merchandising from a television show can grow far beyond the original show, even lasting decades after the show has largely disappeared from popularity. In other cases, large amounts of merchandise can be generated from a pitifully small amount of source material (Mashimaro).

Adult
The most common adult-oriented merchandising is that related to professional sports teams (and their players).

A smaller niche in merchandising is the marketing of more adult-oriented products in connection with similarly adult-oriented films and TV shows. This is common especially with the science fiction and horror genres.  Occasionally, shows which were intended more for children find a following among adults (for example, Gundam model kits). An early example of this phenomenon was the cartoon character Little Lulu, who became licensed to products for adults, such as Kleenex facial tissue.

Sometimes a brand of non-media products can achieve enough recognition and respect that simply putting its name or images on a completely unrelated item can sell that item. An example is Harley-Davidson branded clothing.

Idol goods

Idol goods or idol merchandise are various types of merchandise related to celebrities ("idols"). Consumption of idol goods is a significant part of the idol fandom. Such goods create and reinforce a more physical connection between fans and celebrities.

Examples of common idol goods include stationery items, compact discs, photo albums, calendars, telephone cards, T-shirts (see also concert T-shirt), key chains, lapel pins, and various other goods. Virtual idols can be considered an idol good themselves as they can be bought and sold. An idol can have a tremendous effect on sales of merchandise, an example being David Beckham upon his arrival at Real Madrid in 2003, with an Adidas spokesman stating, "Put Beckham's name on any product and Real Madrid didn't stop selling".

In the 1960s The Beatles were pioneers in conventional retailing in music, setting up their own retail store in London, Apple Boutique, that sold Beatles merchandise.

See also
 Celebrity branding
 Promotional merchandise
 Merchandization
 Visual merchandising
 Gadget
 Tie-in
 Shoplifting
 List of highest-grossing media franchises

References

Further reading

External links

Procter&Gamble merchandising standards

 
Marketing techniques
Promotion and marketing communications
Retail processes and techniques

no:Spin-off#Salgsvarer